Ove Rud (16 December 1923 – 21 September 2007) was a Danish film actor. He appeared in 21 films between 1950 and 2000. He was born in Copenhagen, Denmark and died in Denmark.

Filmography
 Blinkende lygter (2000)
 Skytten (1977)
 Pas på ryggen, professor (1977)
 Mindesmærket (1972)
 Ekko af et skud (1970)
 Människor möts och ljuv musik uppstår i hjärtat (1967)
 Gys og gæve tanter (1966)
 Een pige og 39 sømænd (1965)
 Paradis retur (1964)
 Far til fire med fuld musik (1961)
 Jetpiloter (1961)
 Det skete på Møllegården (1960)
 Forelsket i København (1960)
 Sømand i knibe (1960)
 Poeten og Lillemor og Lotte (1960)
 Bundfald (1957)
 Flintesønnerne (1956)
 Ordet (1955)
 This Is Life (1953)
 Fløjtespilleren (1953)
 I gabestokken (1950)

External links

1923 births
2007 deaths
Danish male film actors
Male actors from Copenhagen
20th-century Danish male actors